Hegesandridas or Agesandridas (Gr.  or ), son of a "Hegesander" or "Agesander", perhaps the same who is mentioned as a member of the last Spartan embassy sent to Athens before the Peloponnesian War, was himself a Spartan general in that war.  In 411 BC he was placed in command of a fleet of 42 ships destined to further a revolt in Euboea.  News of their being seen off Las of Laconia came to Athens at the time when the Four Hundred were building their fort of Eëtioneia on a promontory commanding Piraeus, and the coincidence was used by Theramenes in evidence of their treasonable intentions.  Further intelligence that the same fleet had sailed over from Megara to Salamis coincided again with the riot in Piraeus, and was held to be certain proof of the allegation of Theramenes.

Thucydides thinks it possible that the movement was really made in concert with the Athenian oligarchs, but far more probable that Hegesandridas was merely prompted by an indefinite hope of profiting by the existing dissensions.  His ulterior design was soon seen to be Euboea; the fleet doubled Sunium, and finally came to harbor at Oropos in September of 411 BC.  A great alarm went up on behalf of the threatened island of Euboea, and a fleet was hastily manned, which amounted to thirty-six galleys, and the Battle of Eretria was begun.  But the new crews were inexperienced and poorly equipped; a stratagem of the Eretrians kept the soldiers at a distance, at the very moment when, in obedience to a signal from the town, the Spartan admiral moved to attack.  He obtained an easy victory: the Athenians lost 22 ships, and all of Euboea, except Oreus, revolted.  Extreme consternation seized the city.  Athens, Thucydides adds, had now once again to thank their enemy's tardiness.  Had the victors attacked Piraeus, either the city would have fallen victim to its distractions, or by the recall of the fleet from Asia, everything except Attica would have been placed in their hands.

Hegesandridas was content with his previous success.  However, after the Spartan defeat at Cynossema, Hegesandridas was ordered to reinforce the Hellespontine fleet under the Spartan admiral Mindarus.  Fifty of Hegesandridas' ships (partly Euboean) were dispatched, and all were lost in a storm off Athos; so relates Ephorus.

On the news of this disaster, Hegesandridas appears to have sailed with what ships he could gather to the Hellespont.  Here, at any rate, we find him at the opening of Xenophon's Hellenica; and here he defeated a small squadron recently come from Athens under Thymochares, his opponent at Eretria.  He is mentioned once again as an epibates (Sparatn naval commander) on the Thracian coast in 408 BC.

References

Ancient Spartan admirals
5th-century BC Spartans
Spartans of the Peloponnesian War